Laning is surname. Notable people with the surname include:

 Albert P. Laning (1817–1880), New York politician
 Edward Laning (1906-1981), American painter
 Harris Laning (1873-1941), United States Navy admiral
 J. Ford Laning (1853-1941), American politician
 J. Halcombe Laning, Jr. (1920-2012), American computer pioneer